Claro Brasil, known as Claro, is a mobile, satellite-television, fixed and broadband telecommunications operator serving Brazil. It was created in 2003 as a result of the union of six regional operators
 Americel (Acre, Distrito Federal, Goiás, Mato Grosso, Mato Grosso do Sul, Rondônia and Tocantins);
 ATL, (Espírito Santo and Rio de Janeiro);
 BCP (Greater São Paulo, Pernambuco, Alagoas, Ceará, Paraíba, Piauí and Rio Grande do Norte);
 Claro Digital (Rio Grande do Sul);
 TESS (inland and coast of the state of São Paulo).
In September 2003, it was announced the consolidation of all these operators under a single brand, Claro. It is controlled by the Mexican company América Móvil, one of the largest mobile phone groups in the world that, since 2006, has adopted the Claro brand in 16 other Latin American countries: Argentina, Uruguay, Paraguay, Chile, Costa Rica, Ecuador, El Salvador, Honduras, Nicaragua, Guatemala, Panama, Peru, Puerto Rico, the Dominican Republic and Colombia.

In January 2015, Claro incorporated the companies Embratel and NET and became a publicly held company, with a corporate name "Claro S.A.", but maintaining the brands of the companies, different from what occurred in the merger of Telefônica's operations in Brazil by its Subsidiary Vivo.

References

América Móvil
Mobile phone companies of Brazil
Internet service providers of Brazil
Telecommunications companies established in 2003
2003 establishments in Brazil
Companies based in São Paulo
Brazilian subsidiaries of foreign companies